Vanganoor (also known as Vanganur), is a village in Pallipattu Taluk, Tiruvallur District, Tamil Nadu, India.

Geography 
The village of Vanganoor is situated between Tiruttani and Sholingur, about 10 km from Sholingur Town and 20 km from Tiruttani. In addition, it is about 20 km from Pallipattu, 40 km from Chittoor, 50 km from the municipality of Tirupathi, 57 km from Tiruvallur, 3 km from RK Pet, and 101 km from the state capital Chennai. The Vanganoor Census Town has a population of 6,584, of which 3,349 are males and 3,235 are females per Census India 2011.

Transport
The village is located in Tiruttai - Chittoor route. To reach Vanganoor:

Lot of trains from Chennai to Tiruttani, lots of buses from Tiruttani to Bengaluru, Vellore, Sholinghur, Chittoor, Pallipattu via Vanganoor

Schools 
 Govt. Boys Higher Secondary School
 Govt. Girls Higher Secondary School
 Vethathiri Maharishi Matriculation School
 Ayyan Matriculation School 
 Sri Balaji Vidya Mandir Matriculation School 
 Billa Bong CBSE School

Landmarks 
 Perumal Temple (built in 600 AD)

References

Tiruvallur district